Jānis Rozītis (20 March 1913 – 3 May 1942) was a Bulgaria-born Latvian football and ice hockey player. In football, he played as a forward and became a two-time champion of Latvia and a Latvia national team regular in the mid-1930s.

Biography
Rozitis was born at Sliven, Bulgaria, where his parents lived before the First World War, his father being Eduard Voldemars Rozitis and Anna (nee Immaka). In 1938 Rozitis married Mirdza Bekmanis by whom he had one son.

Rozitis became a mechanic working at motor company VEF in Riga and did compulsory military service in the Heavy Artillery of the Latvian Army during the 1930s.

Rozītis started playing football with the youth squad of RFK. He played his first official matches for the side in 1932 and in 1933 he became a regular. On 10 June 1934, Rozītis made his first international appearance for Latvia as he replaced another youngster - Ēriks Raisters in a friendly match against Lithuania. He scored his first goal for Latvia in a friendly against Estonia national football team on 12 June 1935. In total between 1934 and 1939 Rozītis scored 7 goals over 26 matches. With RFK Rozītis won the Latvian Higher League titles in 1934 and 1935. He competed for the Latvian national ice hockey team at the 1936 Winter Olympics.

After the 1936 season Rozītis left RFK and continued playing with the football club of his work place - biggest Riga factory VEF. Rozītis had been playing with VEF Rīga in addition to RFK since at least 1934 in clerks tournaments but as VEF side was aiming for the top-flight it acquired several higher class footballers to play with its side full-time, and Rozītis was the most notable of those.

Although it was not until 1939 when VEF gained a place in the Latvian Higher League, Rozītis did not lose his place in the national team in 1938 and 1939. He stayed with VEF after Latvia was annexed by the Soviet Union in 1940 and he also stayed there when Latvia was occupied by Nazi Germany in 1941. Rozītis died in an accident on 3 May 1943 aged 29, together with two other VEF footballers – Leonīds Peiča and Arnolds Boka – in Riga, Reichskommissariat Ostland, Nazi Germany - when they were blown up attempting to remove German Army munitions that had been stored on the VEF playing field. The three team mates were buried in the First Forest Cemetery, Riga.

Honours
 Latvian Higher League: 1934, 1935
 Baltic Cup: 1937

References

1913 births
1942 deaths
Footballers from Riga
Latvian footballers
Association football forwards
Latvia international footballers
Ice hockey players at the 1936 Winter Olympics
Olympic ice hockey players of Latvia
Latvian casualties of World War II
Deaths by airstrike during World War II
Civilians killed in World War II
Ice hockey people from Riga